Colmegna railway station is a railway station in the comune of Luino, in the Italian region of Lombardy. It is an intermediate stop on the standard gauge Cadenazzo–Luino line of Rete Ferroviaria Italiana.

Services 
 the following services stop at Colmegna:

References

External links 
 
 

Buildings and structures in the Province of Varese
Railway stations in Lombardy